Tayfour Bathaii(born March 8, 1947), writer, film director, activist, was born in Sanandaj, Iran. After finishing high school in Sanandaj, he started his 2-year mandatory military services as a teacher. From 1969 to 1972, he attended the Tehran School of Television and Cinema to become a TV cameraman. In the 70's, due to his leftist tendencies and alleged affiliation with the "Group of 12" accused of plotting to kidnap Farah Pahlavi, the Queen of Iran, and the crown prince, he was tried and sentenced to life in prison. During the revolution of 1979 in Iran, along with other political prisoners, he was released and returned to Sanandaj, a Province of Kurdistan, Iran. He joined the Democratic Party of Kurdistan and was a member of this party until 1985. He has continued his life in Sweden since then as a political activist, writer, sculptor, and film director. He also teaches cinema and documentary cinematography.

Early life
Tayfour was the 5th child of 8, born in the Jorabad neighborhood of Sanandaj, Iran. The son of a school teacher and a home maker, he attended 15 Bahman Elementary School and Avicenna and Shahpour High Schools. After finishing high school, he served in the military as a Teacher (Sepah Danesh) in Turkmen Sahra for two years. This is followed by passing the entrance exam into Tehran School of Television and Cinema in 1969. He then went on to work for Shiraz TV where he met Keramat Daneshian, another student of Tehran School of Cinema, who introduced Tayfour to armed struggle customary of the 1960s and 1970s.

The Struggle

Plotting to take hostages, trial, and prison
A group spearheaded by Samakar and Allamehzadeh, suggested the plot of taking the Queen of Iran and her son hostage in exchange for political prisoners. While contemplating the idea and making preparations, Tayfour and his friend, Keramat, were given up to the authorities by Amir Hossein Fetanat who was in contact with Keramat. The group (except for Fetanat) was arrested in 1973. During interrogations, another group who was plotting to attack the King of Iran, were discovered and the two groups were put on trial together without having any relationships with each other. The accused, known as the group of 12, were: Tayfour Bathaii, Khosrow Golsorkhi, Monouchehr Moghadam Salimi, Keramat Daneshian, Abbas Samakar, Reza Alamehzadeh, Iraj Jamshidi, Shokooh Mirzadegi, Mortezah Siahpoosh, Maryam Etehadieh, Ibrahim Farhang, and Farhad Ghaysari. In the first trial, Tayfour along with Keramat Daneshian, Abbas Samakar, Reza Alamehzadeh, and Khosrow Golsorkhi were sentenced to be executed while the rest of the group received lesser sentences. The same sentences were handed down in the second trial but after the final trial only Keramat Daneshian and Khosrow Golsorkhi were executed due to their ideological arguments and the others' death sentences were reduced to life in prison.

Return to Kurdistan and then exile
After 5 years of captivity, Tayfour along with other political prisoners were released from prison a few months before the 1979 revolution in Iran. He returned to his hometown of Sanandaj where he joined the Democratic Party of Kurdistan of Iran (PDKI). In the winter of 1982, during the 5th congress, he was elected to the central committee of PDKI where he became the head of the Youth Organization in the party. During his time with the party, he made a four-part documentary movie that depicted the life and struggles of the Kurds. "Naan va Azadi" (bread and freedom), was the most famous film which was featured, along with his other films, in the Exile Film Festival.
Tayfour resigned from the party in 1985 following the conflict escalation between PDKI and Komala (another Kurdish party) that resulted in clashes between the two parties.
Currently, he lives in Sweden where he spends most of his time writing.

His work

Film
 Suffering - 1979
 Bread and Freedom - 1983
 Migration (nomads) - 1983
 Proud mountain peaks - 1983
 Light of candles - 1983
 Pack of wolves (Long movie) - 1990
 Debliachah, Documentary about Gypsies
 Dark conspiracy - 2006

Books in Persian
 Life in the Wind (Novel)
 Four stories (Novel)
 Haves and have nots of the world (Translation)
 Mr. Chokh Bakhtiar
 Dreamy Journey - From Kursan to Kurdistan (Autobiography)
 Life like itself (Novel)

Books in Kurdish
 Life like itself (Novel)
 Dreamy Journey - From Kursan to Kurdistan (Autobiography)
 Galavizh (Screen play)
 Women rights in Kurdish society (Research based book, Coauthor Jila Faraji)
 Life in the Wind (Novel)

References
 http://taifor.nu/start.htm
 https://archive.today/20160403220357/http://www.lajvar.se/ketab/shoreshi/shoreshi-samakar.ht
 Two critique essays on Reza Alamehzadeh by Abbas Samakar and Tayfour Bathaii http://www.peykeiran.com/Content.aspx?ID=46718
 Bathaii, Tayfour, Dreamy Journey - From Kursan to Kurdistan (Autobiography), Published by House of Art and Literature, Gothenburg, Sweden, 2012
 Ezat Shahi's Memoir (30) https://web.archive.org/web/20160313071716/http://irandidban.com/master.asp?id=13144
 BBC Farsi http://www.bbc.com/persian/arts/2014/04/140425_l41_book_fetanat_interview
 Man Yek Shooreshi Hastam (Book) By Abbas Samakar, Publisher: Ketab Corporation 
 An untimely cup of tea, Iran's Oral History, reported by Mahmoud Afzali, http://www.oral-history.ir/?page=post&id=2123
 A hand on art and an eye on politics, reported by Mahmoud Afzali, http://www.oral-history.ir/?page=post&id=1946
 32 years after releasing a thousand political prisoners, The New Era, Yadolah Baladi, http://asre-nou.net/php/view_print_version.php?objnr=11994
 Welcoming the 8th International Festival of Cinema in Exile, October 2007, Gothenburg, Sweden, https://web.archive.org/web/20140713030505/http://www.cinemaye-azad.com/views%26news/views%26news01.html

Iranian revolutionaries
1947 births
Living people
Iranian expatriates in Sweden